Daniel Santos Peña (born October 10, 1975) is a Puerto Rican former professional boxer who competed from 1996 to 2009. He is a world champion in two weight classes, having held the WBO welterweight title from 2000 to 2001, the WBO light middleweight title from 2002 to 2005, and the WBA light middleweight title from 2008 to 2009. As an amateur, Santos represented Puerto Rico in international events, including the 1990 and 1992 Junior World Championships, Pan American Boxing Tournament, Goodwill Games, 1995 Pan American Games and the 1996 Summer Olympics, where he won a bronze medal at welterweight.

Amateur career and early life
Santos was raised in a family where boxing was a common profession, with his father Paquito Santos being a trainer and his brother Edgardo Santos being a former professional boxer. Early in his life Daniel Santos was enrolled in a school specialized in sports, located in a facility designed for the training of Olympic athletes in Puerto Rico. He eventually graduated from this institution and continued a career in boxing. Santos began to compete in the international amateur circuit in 1990. On this year he won the bronze medal in the World Junior Championships that were organized in Lima, Peru. Two years later he competed in the World Junior Championships that were celebrated in Montreal, Quebec, Canada, where he won the bronze medal, for the second straight time in a competition with worldwide scope. On 1993 he debuted in the adult division when he competed in the Panamerican Boxing championship. This event took place in Salinas, Puerto Rico. Santos won the gold medal on this tournament. In 1994 Santos represented Puerto Rico in the Goodwill Games that took place in Saint Petersburg, Russia. Here, Santos finished third in his division and won the bronze medal. His next international participation was in the 1995 Pan American games celebrated in Mar del Plata, Argentina, where he won the silver medal. The  result of the championship fight was controversial, when David Reid won the fight by decision after Santos scored a knockdown during the course of the contest. Santos represented Puerto Rico once again at the 1996 Summer Olympics organized in Atlanta, Georgia. Here he competed in three fights, he defeated two adversaries by unanimous decision, these were: Kabil Lahsen of Morocco with score of 16–4 and Nariman Atayev of Uzbekistan with a score of 28–15. In his first fight he defeated Ernest Atangana Mboa of Cameroon by RSC (referee stopping contest) at the 2:54 mark of the first round. His last fight was against Oleg Saitov of Russia where he lost by points with score of 11–13. He finished the competition in the third global place and won the bronze medal, with this medal Santos became the sixth Puerto Rican boxer to win an Olympic medal. Daniel finished his amateur career compiling a record of 117 fights won and three defeats.

Professional career

Welterweight
Santos debuted as a professional on September 28, 1996, against Andre Hawthorne in Fort Worth, Texas, in a fight where he won by technical knockout in the first round. Following this fight Santos compiled a record of twenty-one victories, one defeat and one draw before competing for a world championship. During this period Santos boxed in the welterweight division, his adversaries in this stage of his career included: Bernard Gray, Miguel Gonzalez, former world title challenger  Fidel Avendano, Juan Caslos Rodriguez, William Ruiz and Humberto Rodriguez. The first draw in Santos' career occurred in a fight with Jose Luis Verdugo, that was part of a card that took place in El Cajon, California. On May 7, 1999, Santos competed against Kofi Jantuah in Las Vegas, Nevada. Jantuah won this contest by technical knockout in the fifth round, marking Santos' first defeat in the professional circuit.

WBO welterweight title
Santos fought Ahmed Kotiev for the World Boxing Organization's welterweight championship on November 27, 1999. Kotiev retained the championship by split decision. The scores of the judges were 115-113 and 115–113 in favor of Kotiev and 117–111 in favor of Santos. The fight was subsequently described as a "competitive and highly entertaining fight" and the result was reviewed as a "disputed" close split decision. On May 6, 2000, these two boxers competed in a rematch of their previous fight. In the fifth round Santos won the fight by knockout, in the process winning his first professional championship, the World Boxing Organization's championship.

On July 21, 2000, Santos defended the welterweight championship against Giovanni Parisi in Calabria, Italy. Santos won the fight by knockout in the fourth round. Following the fight Parisi stated that the welterweight championship was always his interest as he wanted to become the first Italian to win world championships in three different divisions. In this interview he claimed that his training prior to the fight was insufficient. Giovanni said: "We battled in Reggio Calabria, a coin toss from Sicily, and he KOed me during the 4th round. I have no excuses. I didn't train properly."

His second defense was against Neil Sinclair in Yorkshire, Great Britain. In the first round Sinclair's offensive was effective and he scored a knockdown on the defending champion. On the second round Santos responded to Sinclair's strategy and won the fight by knockout. Prior to the fight Sinclair noted that a fight between Santos and him was supposed to happen eight years before, "We were both in the 1992 World junior championships in Montreal. We were both at the same weight and were at other side of the draw from each other and ended up with bronze medals. So I have watched him fight in person and shook hands on the podium. If we had both won our semi-finals we would have faced each other."  Sinclair also stated that he expected to win based on his training, he said that all of his sparring partners were southpaws since Santos is one, this preparation also included contracting a new trainer.

On July 21, 2001, Santos defended against Antonio Margarito in a card that took place in Bayamón, Puerto Rico. This marked the first time that Santos fought a world title fight in Puerto Rico. At the moment of the fight Margarito was the mandatory challenger appointed by the World Boxing Organization, and it was televised on Showtime Too. The fight ended in at the 2:11 mark on the first round when the fight was stopped due to a large injury over Margarito's right eye, the cut caused by an accidental head butt. The fight was declared a no-contest and Santos retained the welterweight championship by default. Following the conclusion of the contest both competitors were visibly angered at the sudden conclusion.

Light-middleweight

WBO light-middleweight title
Santos boxed for the vacant WBO light-middleweight title against Yori Boy Campas in a fight that took place at Bally's Event Center in Las Vegas, Nevada. Santos won the fight when referee Joe Cortez intervened in the eleventh round. During the course of the fight numerous combinations hurt Campas and cut his face, in the eleventh round following one of Santos' punches Campas informed Cortez that his vision was not functioning properly. At the moment of the fight's conclusion the scores of the judges were 99–91, 97–93 and 99–90 in favor of Santos. On August 17, 2002, Santos defended this championship for a first time against Mehrdud Takaloo, in a fight that also involved the World Boxing Union Light middleweight championship. The event took place in the Cardiff Castle located in Cardiff, Wales. Takaloo began the fight by using his right hand often and on the fourth round he scored a knockdown. As the fight progressed Takaloo began to show signs of exhaustion and Santos managed to have a strong performance in the second half of the fight. Takaloo received cuts around both of his eyes which made the referee consider stopping the fight twice in the tenth round. When the fight ended Santos won the contest by unanimous decision and the judges' scores were 116–111, 116–112, 117–110.

On January 14, 2004, Warrior's Boxing Promotions announced that they had signed Santos to exclusively acquire the rights to promote the fights where he performed. At the moment of the announcement Santos said that he expected to have a productive business relationship with the promotion, and highlighted the company's organization, he said: "I am very impressed with the Warriors organization and believe that they will provide me with the platform to show the world that I am truly one of the best champions competing today." The executive director of the promotion, Jessie Robinson said that the company had been scouting Daniel for years, his words were: "We have had our eye on Santos for the past two years and strongly feel that he is a serious player in the junior middleweight division. We will be announcing our long term plans for Mr. Santos shortly."

On September 11, 2004, Santos fought in a rematch against Antonio Margarito as part of the undercard of the Cotto-Pinto undercard. Early in the fight Santos' strategy consisted of connecting with short punches with his left arm,  including a strong impact to Margarito's face in the first round. In the fifth round Margarito connected several strong punches to his head and body. Throughout the course of the fight both boxers fought at close quarters which led to their heads hitting against each other several times. Margarito's face began bleeding in the sixth round which led to the referee stopping the fight twice in this round. Attempts by Francisco Ezpinoza, Margarito's cutman,  to stop the bleeding were unsuccessful. In the late rounds Santos began boxing and focused some of his punches in Margarito's wound. In the tenth round Margarito responded to the bell but following  the first seconds of the round the ringside doctor declared that he could not continue further. The result of the fight was decided by the scores of the judges, awarding Santos a victory by technical decision. On June 28, 2003, he defended against Fulgencio Zúñiga in a card that took place in the Ruben Rodriguez Coliseum in Bayamón, Puerto Rico. Daniel won the contest by unanimous decision with identical scores of 118–110.

Santos was under contract with Warrior's Boxing Promotions for one year, his contract ended when he abandoned the promotion. On April 26, 2005, Don King Productions announced that the company had acquired the exclusive rights to promote Santos' fights. At the moment of the announcement Don King stated that: "Daniel is another proud Puerto Rican world champion and I'm excited to have him with me, Junior middleweight is a solid division and there are many fights we can make for this great champion. Viva Puerto Rico!." Santos said that this event held significance in his life because:"I want to fight all the best fighters and by being with the best promoter, I know I will get those fights and make good money. I look forward to a long and happy relationship with Don King." When interviewed about Santos' signing, Félix Trinidad Sr. said that he was impressed by Santos' performance against Antonio Margarito and said that a fight between him and Félix Trinidad seemed plausible at the moment. On December 3, 2005, Santos was scheduled to defend the light middleweight championship against Sergiy Dzindziruk. In the eight round of the competition Dzinziruk  scored a knockdown. The three judges gave the fight a score of 115–112 in favor of Dzinziruk  thus making him the new WBO champion.

On October 6, 2007, Santos returned to action following a period of fifteen months of inactivity. This event took place in a fight card presented in the Madison Square Garden, against José Antonio Rivera. The contest ended in the eight round when Rivera's corner surrendered by "throwing in the towel". At the moment of the fight's conclusion Rivera was receiving several combinations of punches to the face and displayed several injuries and cuts in his face as well as having his nose swollen. Prior to the decision Santos scored a knockdown which lasted until the count of eight. Following the fight Daniel noted that "it was a hard fight." and that Rivera was a "hardy boxer with strong punches", stating that his physical condition was responsible for his resistance throughout the contest.

WBA light-middleweight title
On July 11, 2008, Santos competed in his first title fight since returning to action, facing Joachim Alcine for the WBA's light middleweight championship. The first round was used by both fighters to study their adversary's technique. Alcine began the second round aggressively, displaying accuracy in some of his punches. Santos focused on counter-attacking Alcine's offense during the following two rounds. He continued using this pattern, establishing notable control of the fight's tempo in the fifth episode. In the sixth Santos connected a jab and followed it with a left hook, this combination injured Alcine who was unable to respond to the referee's count, losing the contest by knockout. Subsequently, Santos was scheduled to defend the championship against Nobihiro Ishida on January 3, 2009. However, the fight was cancelled after it was suddenly suspended less than a month before the date. Don King proposed a unificatory contest against Sergio Martínez, who held the World Boxing Council's interim championship. Santos refused the offer, citing that he had less than a month to train for it after a long period of inactivity, but expressed interest in organizing it in another date. Consequently, the pugilist was inactive for several months. King made an offer to Ricardo Mayorga, pursuing a fight between both pugilists in May, but the negotiations failed to advance. On August 17, 2009, Top Rank won a bid to organize a fight between Santos and the WBA's first contender, Yuri Foreman. The promotion scheduled the contest to take place as part of the undercard of "Firepower", a card featuring a fight between Miguel Cotto and Manny Pacquiao in the main event. On that date,  Santos lost the championship by unanimous decision to Foreman, with scores of 116–110 and 117–109 twice.

Legal troubles 
On September 27, 2018, Santos was arrested by police, accused of resisting arrest and threatening two policemen who went to his house to arrest him on charges of threatening his ex-wife, an event which had allegedly taken place on September 24 of that year. While taken into custody, Santos was interviewed by a reporter of the popular television gossip show, Lo Se Todo. He took that opportunity to plead with the Puerto Rican public to help him get help for unspecified problems.

Professional boxing record

See also

List of Puerto Rican boxing world champions
List of Puerto Ricans

References

External links

|-

 

Sportspeople from San Juan, Puerto Rico
Boxers at the 1996 Summer Olympics
Olympic boxers of Puerto Rico
Olympic bronze medalists for Puerto Rico
1975 births
Living people
World Boxing Association champions
World Boxing Organization champions
Boxers at the 1995 Pan American Games
Olympic medalists in boxing
Puerto Rican male boxers
Medalists at the 1996 Summer Olympics
Pan American Games silver medalists for Puerto Rico
Pan American Games medalists in boxing
Welterweight boxers
Competitors at the 1994 Goodwill Games
Medalists at the 1995 Pan American Games